Daniel Ruiz Vives (born 1992), is a Grand Prix motorcycle racer from Spain.

Career statistics

By season

Races by year
(key)

References

External links
 Profile on motogp.com

Living people
1992 births
Spanish motorcycle racers
125cc World Championship riders